Tanya Donelly (born July 14, 1966) is an American Grammy Award-nominated singer-songwriter and guitarist based in New England who co-founded Throwing Muses with her step-sister Kristin Hersh. Donelly went on to co-form the alternative rock band The Breeders (alongside Pixies bassist Kim Deal) in 1989, before leaving to front her own band Belly in 1991. By the late 1990s, she settled into a solo recording career, working largely with musicians connected to the Boston music scene.

Donelly is best known for her Grammy-nominated work in the mid-1990s as lead vocalist and songwriter for Belly, when she scored a national radio and music television hit with her composition "Feed the Tree". Belly recorded on Sire/Reprise Records and 4AD Records; Donelly's solo works have been released on Warner Bros. Records and 4AD.

Over the years, she has listed several musical influences. In one interview, she named her guitar playing influences as Marc Ribot, the Beatles, and former bandmate Hersh. More recently, she mentioned Leonard Cohen as a songwriting hero, citing her then current listening favorites as Lucinda Williams and Joan Wasser, and listing Boston-based groups like the Dambuilders, Pixies, and Count Zero as past favorites. Although Donelly mainly performs her own original songs, she has in recent years added covers of songs by Robyn Hitchcock, Nina Simone, the Beatles, and Pixies to her repertoire.

Early life
Donelly has said that her parents, Richard and Kristin Donelly, shuttled the family "between Rhode Island and California" for the first four years of her life. Donelly has described her early school experience as including bouts of nervous shyness from fear that what she has called her family's "hippie" background was different from that of her classmates.

Donelly has said that she met Kristin Hersh in school around age eight, quickly becoming close friends. Donelly's father later married Hersh's mother after both divorced in the 1980s. When she was 12 years old, Donelly and her mother were injured in a traumatic car accident that led her to carefully weigh for the first time her spiritual values and her concept of what "God" was. Previously, her upbringing had been an atheist one, but after the car accident a family friend introduced Donelly to the Hindu traditions of Krishna, in which she immersed herself for a brief period.

Throwing Muses band beginnings

Around age 14, Hersh's and Donelly's fathers both gave them their own guitars and they initially started playing along with Beatles songs. Soon after, the two started to play along with songs written by Hersh's musical father and then began to write original songs of their own. Donelly co-founded Throwing Muses with Hersh and other members like Elaine Adamedes at around age 15.

Throughout the 1980s, Donelly worked as lead guitarist and secondary vocalist/songwriter, complementing the work of Throwing Muses leader Hersh. The group moved from Rhode Island to Boston around 1986 and signed as the first American group on the influential British label 4AD. Although the band's work generally employed complex rhythms and offbeat chord structures, Donelly has said she eventually accepted that her compositions were simpler and had "more traditional songwriting sensibilities" than Hersh's, by the last two years she worked in the band. Some of her tunes from this period include "Green", "Reel," "Pools in Eyes", "The River", "Giant", "Dragonhead", "Honeychain", "Not Too Soon" and "Angel". Hersh's most popular Muses songs like "Fish", "Dizzy", "Counting Backwards" and most of "The Real Ramona" LP almost always featured Donelly's distinctive lead guitar playing, heavy background vocals, inner vocal workings with different lyrics and pop vocal harmonies and melodic hooks.

1990s: Breeders and Belly
By 1990, Donelly had additionally begun working in a side project called The Breeders with Kim Deal of Pixies, a Boston-based group who had opened shows for Throwing Muses in the 1980s. The first album's vocals and songwriting responsibilities were centered on Deal. The group released Pod with Donelly in 1990.

The Real Ramona, Throwing Muses' last album with Donelly, which included her "Not Too Soon" and "Honeychain" originals, was released in 1991. In May 1991, Deal and Donelly were asked to contribute vocals to This Mortal Coil's Blood album on 4AD, with a cover of Chris Bell's "You and Your Sister," a month before Donelly officially left Throwing Muses.

In December 1991, Donelly formed Belly as guitarist, vocalist and songwriter, with Thomas Gorman on lead guitar, Chris Gorman on drums, and Fred Abong (previously with Throwing Muses) on bass guitar. This group would become her primary creative focus for the next few years, as Donelly's participation in The Breeders faded after the 1992 release of the Safari EP.

In 1993 Belly released the Star LP, with Gail Greenwood soon replacing Fred Abong on bass after the release for touring. The album soon peaked at number two on the United Kingdom music charts and featured a single and music video, "Feed the Tree", that quickly was rated number one on the Modern Rock Tracks Survey. The album scored commercial chart successes and was certified as a gold record in 1994 by the RIAA. The band was also nominated for two Grammy Awards (Best New Artist and Best Alternative Music Performance) and won two Boston Music Awards the same year.

In 1995, Belly released a second album, King, which progressed the avant folk-rock influences, power-pop jangle guitar sounds, and vocal harmonies of the first album into a direction driven more by vocals and driving rhythms, varying the pace within the songs to create tension. Flangers and chorus effects were evident in the guitar sounds. This album, produced by Glyn Johns, did not match the commercial success of Star. The band broke up in 1996.

1990s solo career begins
In 1995, during her post-Belly/pre-solo career, Donelly recorded a track with Catherine Wheel entitled "Judy Staring at the Sun," which appeared on Catherine Wheel's 1995 album Happy Days. The single version featured Donelly and Catherine Wheel's lead singer Rob Dickinson singing in trade-off vocals, but after the final Belly album, Catherine Wheel's record label insisted that the song be re-recorded to remove most of Donelly's vocals, replacing them with Dickinson's, although Donelly's voice can still be heard during the chorus of the reworked version.

The 1995 tribute album Saturday Morning: Cartoons' Greatest Hits, produced by Ralph Sall for MCA Records, included the cover of "Josie and the Pussycats" performed by Tanya Donelly and Juliana Hatfield.

In November 1996, Donelly put together a group of musicians to tour internationally with, just prior to her first solo release, the Sliding & Diving EP on 4AD. Included on the tour were husband Fisher on bass, keyboardist Lisa Mednick (formerly of Juliana Hatfield's group), drummer Stacy Jones (formerly of Letters to Cleo and Veruca Salt), and Madder Rose guitarists Mary Lorson and Billy Coté. The album release featured Donelly on vocals, guitars and keyboards, Rich Gilbert (of Human Sexual Response, Goober & the Peas, Blackstone Valley Sinners) on pedal steel, Fisher on bass, and drummers David Lovering (formerly of the Pixies) and Jones.

After the 1997 dual solo release of Pretty Deep with two different B-sides, she toured North America with Fisher, Throwing Muses' drummer Dave Narcizo, Gilbert, and keyboardist Elizabeth Steen. She soon released her solo debut LP Lovesongs for Underdogs, recorded with Gilbert, Fisher, Jones, Narcizo, and engineer Wally Gagel on assorted instruments.

Career since 2000
In 2000, Donelly performed live in her first reunion with Throwing Muses at a special fan gathering called "Gut Pageant" in Cambridge, Massachusetts, and at a Rhode Island festival.

She continued to record and release symbol-laden, alternative folk-pop solo EPs and full-length LPs on 4AD in 2001, 2002, and 2004. Belly's Sweet Ride: The Best of Belly retrospective was also released in 2002.

As Donelly's writing continued to mature into a softer rhythmic vein than with the Belly material, allusions to motherhood were heard in songs like "Life is But a Dream" and "The Night You Saved My Life" on her 2002 Beautysleep release. Mark Sandman, of Boston's Morphine indie-rock group, sang on "Moonbeam Monkey." Donelly's background vocals are heard on several tracks of the 2003 self-titled Throwing Muses reunion album, which she helped promote with public performances as backing vocalist and guitarist for a few concerts in 2003. Boston post-punk band Mission of Burma included Donelly's backing vocals on their reunion album, Onoffon in 2004.

The same year, she released Whiskey Tango Ghosts, a sparely arranged, acoustic album laced with Gilbert's pedal steel guitar touches. The album's personnel included Steen on piano, Narcizo on drums, and Fisher on guitar, bass, and drums. The album's lyrics explored, in part, marital relationships and family life. Donelly has said the album's minor-key tone was influenced by "a horrible war, a horrible administration, a bleak, mean winter."

She then followed that acoustic album release with three weekend shows of old and new songs performed in 2004 before audiences at The Windham, an old hotel in Bellows Falls, Vermont. Backing Donelly in concert were Fisher on guitar, Gilbert on pedal steel and acoustic guitar, Joan Wasser ((of the Dambuilders, and Joan as Policewoman), Lou Reed, Antony and the Johnsons) on violin and backing vocals, Joe McMahon (of Señor Happy and Will Dailey) on upright bass, Bill Janovitz (lead singer of Buffalo Tom) contributing vocals, and Arthur Johnson (of Come) on drums. The performances were recorded by Donelly's manager, veteran producer Gary Smith of Fort Apache Studios, which helps operate the small concert space and recording room in The Windham's lobby. While Donelly included some of her longtime lyrical allusions to nature imagery, such as bees and honey, in the songs recorded at the Vermont concerts, she said that some of her new material reflected a more direct approach, relying less on symbolic analogy. The topics of religion and spiritual hypocrisy, which first began to interest her after her childhood automobile accident, were reflected in the lyrics to "Kundalini Slide," performed at these concerts. The album of the Vermont performances is titled This Hungry Life and was released by Eleven Thirty Records on October 17, 2006 in the US and October 24, 2006 in Canada.
 
In June 2005, Donelly mentioned on her official "Slumberland" message board that her future plans included working on a children's compilation album with Boston musicians such as Chris Toppin, writing a book, working with Mark Eitzel and Greek songwriter Manolis Famellos, and occasionally performing live. She planned to focus future performance plans on a few cities like Boston, New York, and London, playing live when time permitted as she raised her daughter. In March 2006, she gave birth to another daughter, Harriet Pearl Fisher.

In early 2006, Donelly sang on two songs on the debut EP from the Boston-based band Dylan In The Movies. In October 2006, she recorded a cover of Neil Young's "Heart of Gold" with producer Paul Kolderie for the American Laundromat Records benefit CD titled Cinnamon Girl - Women Artists Cover Neil Young for Charity.

She wrote four songs for the pop girl group Girl Authority for their second debut Road Trip, one of which is titled "This Is My Day". Her daughter, Gracie, is a fan of the group, according to an article in The Phoenix.

Two shows at the Brattle Theatre in Cambridge, Massachusetts, on October 6, 2007, were a musical reunion of sorts, as Donelly co-headlined with Hersh.

In 2008, Donelly teamed up with Dylan in the Movies to cover The Cure's "Lovecats" for American Laundromat Records tribute compilation "Just Like Heaven - a tribute to The Cure".

A 2010 feature in Spin Magazine profiles Donelly's new career as a postpartum doula.

In December 2010, Donelly teamed up once again with singer and songwriter Brian Sullivan's band, Dylan In The Movies, to release the single "Girl With the Black Tights" on American Laundromat Records. Donelly shares a co-writing credit and sings on the track.

In August 2013, Donelly surprised her audience by announcing a series of extended plays to be issued online. Each release featured songs co-written with friends, musicians and previous collaborators including authors. The first volume contained five songs; "Mass Ave" (for which a video was also released), "Christopher Street", "Let Fall The Sky", "Blame The Muse" and "Meteor Shower". In a rare and extensive interview on a podcast by UK music website The Mouth Magazine, Donelly announced that the series was her way of taking control of an exit strategy as she retired from the music industry.

In early February 2016, the official Belly website announced the group would reform to play shows in Europe the following July and, subsequently, North America. She composed the score for the 2022 animated film Luck.

Personal life
Donelly married former Juliana Hatfield bassist Dean Fisher on September 22, 1996. They have two daughters.

Discography

Solo
Albums
 Lovesongs for Underdogs (1997)
 Beautysleep (2002)
 Whiskey Tango Ghosts (2004)
 This Hungry Life (2006)

EPs
 Sliding & Diving (1996)
 The Bright Light, disc 1 (1997)
 The Bright Light, disc 2 (1997)
 Pretty Deep, disc 1 (1997)
 Pretty Deep, disc 2 (1997)
 Sleepwalk (2001)
 Swan Song Series, Vol. 1 (2013)
 Swan Song Series, Vol. 2 (2013)
 Swan Song Series, Vol. 3 (2013)
 Swan Song Series, Vol. 4 (2014)
 Swan Song Series, Vol. 5 (2014)

Other albums
 Beautysleep and Lovesongs Demos (2006)

Tanya Donelly and the Parkington Sisters
 Tanya Donelly and the Parkington Sisters (2020)

References

Other sources

 Ankeny, Jason. [ "Tanya Donelly".] Allmusic. Retrieved January 29, 2006.
 Evans, Liz (1994). Women, Sex and Rock 'N' Roll: In Their Own Words. Pandora. .
 Fortier, James. Tanya Donelly: Storyboard to the singer/songwriter's career. Retrieved April 20, 2005.
 ""An Interview With Tanya Donelly". (January 26, 2005). Boston Beats. Retrieved April 13, 2005.
 Koradi, Reto (February 27, 1995). "Review: Belly, King". Consumable. Retrieved April 13, 2005.
 Krinsky, David (February 20, 2002). "Tanya Donelly Gets Her Beauty Sleep: College rocker grows up on second solo effort". Rolling Stone. Retrieved April 13, 2005.
 Le, Vinh (1996–2005). "Tanya Timeline". Vinh Le's Belly/Tanya Donelly Pages. Retrieved April 13, 2005.
 Le, Vinh (1996–2005). "Tanya Discography". Vinh Le's Belly/Tanya Donelly Pages. Retrieved April 26, 2005.
 [ "Lovesongs for Underdogs Credits"]. Allmusic. Retrieved April 13, 2005.
 Milano, Brett (November 21, 1996). "On Her Own: Tanya Donelly Begins Life After Belly". Boston Phoenix. Retrieved April 13, 2005.
 Obrecht, Jas (March 1995). "Belly Up! The Rise of Tanya Donelly & Tom Gorman." Guitar Player.
 Phares, Heather (2002). [ "Beautysleep Review"]. Allmusic. Retrieved April 13, 2005.
 White, Timothy (January 16, 1993). "Discovering Belly's Personal Politics." Billboard.
 "Tanya Donelly's This Hungry Life Set for October 17th Release." Eleven Thirty Records Website. Retrieved July 25, 2006.
 "Tanya Donelly - The Mouthcast" The Mouth Magazine. Retrieved August 22, 2013.

External links

 4AD artist website
 Beggars Banquet and Beggars Group labels
 Tanya Donelly site at Fort Apache
 

1966 births
Living people
4AD artists
American women singer-songwriters
American women rock singers
American rock guitarists
American rock songwriters
Musicians from Newport, Rhode Island
Songwriters from Rhode Island
The Breeders members
Throwing Muses members
Guitarists from Rhode Island
20th-century American guitarists
Remote Control Records artists
20th-century American women guitarists